Michael John Whitehall (born 12 April 1940) is an English author, producer, talent agent and television personality. He is a former theatrical agent who went on to form two production companies, Havahall Pictures (with Nigel Havers) in 1988, and Whitehall Films in 1998. He has represented Colin Firth and Dame Judi Dench. He is the father of comedian and actor Jack Whitehall.

Early life and education
Whitehall was born on 12 April 1940 in the United Kingdom. He was educated at Ampleforth College, a Catholic boarding school in Yorkshire, run by Benedictine monks. After his education, Whitehall worked as a film reporter for The Universe, a weekly Catholic newspaper.
Both his father and grandfather were commercial travellers. His education was paid for by his grandfather, who had inherited significant wealth from his cousin, a wool merchant.

Career
Whitehall has produced TV programmes such as Bertie and Elizabeth, Noah's Ark, Element of Doubt, The Good Guys and A Perfect Hero.  He represented Judi Dench, Colin Firth, Richard E. Grant, and Leslie Grantham.

He has made guest appearances on various television shows including Countdown, John Bishop's Britain, The Million Pound Drop Live, Alexander Armstrong's Big Ask and Alan Carr: Chatty Man. In 2013, it was announced that he would present a TV chat show for the BBC with his son Jack. The first series of Backchat began airing on BBC Three, starting on 20 November 2013 but has since moved to BBC Two. In 2017, he co-presented Jack Whitehall: Travels with My Father, a travel documentary/road trip through Southeast Asia with his son on Netflix. In 2018, Travels had a second series where they visited several countries in Eastern Europe. In 2019, Travels had a third, two-episode series where they visited, California, Arizona, and Nevada in the USA. In 2020, Travels had a fourth, two-episode series where they visited Australia. In 2021, Travels has a fifth, three-episode series where they traveled around the U.K. This series would go on to be the final series of the show. In 2019, Michael appeared in the programme Who Do You Think You Are? (UK TV series) along with his son Jack to discover his heritage.

Whitehall's first book was Shark Infested Waters: Tales of an Actors' Agent, and his son Jack illustrated it. The Times Literary Supplement (TLS) called the book "a most entertaining memoir" that was "wittily illustrated". In October 2013, he released his second book Him & Me, which was co-written with his son. Written in two distinctive styles, it reflects the different personalities of its authors.

Personal life
Whitehall married Jane McIntosh in 1969. After their divorce in 1973, McIntosh married lyricist Tim Rice. Whitehall married television actress Hilary Amanda Jane Isbister (stage surname Gish) on 12 April 1986, Whitehall's 46th birthday.

As of 2013, Whitehall and Isbister were living in Putney in the London Borough of Wandsworth. They have three children together: Jack Whitehall (born 1988), Molly (born 1989) and Barnaby (born 1992).

Whitehall is a supporter of the Conservative Party.

Books
 Shark Infested Waters: Tales of an Actors' Agent (Timewell Press, 2007) 
 Him & Me  by Michael and Jack Whitehall (Michael Joseph, 2013) 
 Backing into the Spotlight: A Memoir (Constable, 2017)

Filmography

Television

References

External links

1940 births
Living people
English talent agents
English television personalities
English television producers
People educated at Ampleforth College
Place of birth missing (living people)